Magallanes, officially the Municipality of Magallanes,  is a 4th class municipality in the province of Cavite, Philippines. According to the 2020 census, it has a population of 23,851 people.

The municipality is named after Ferdinand Magellan, who was known in Spanish as Fernando de Magallanes.

History
Magallanes began its history as a barrio called Panitan, then a part of the municipality of Maragondon. Panitan was derived from the Tagalog word "panit", meaning "to remove the bark of a tree". Long before the coming of the Spaniards, there grew along the mountainside of this barrio big trees called bitangcol which provide a source of income for the people. The barks of the trees are removed (panitan) and used as containers for storing palay or unhusked rice. The fibers of the barks were removed and twined into durable ropes. Because of this unusual occupation of the people the barrio came to be known as Panitan or Banitan.

The first inhabitants of Panitan were Isidro Baltao, Glicerio Manalo, Florentino Mojica, and Ignacio Arat. Time came when the people, tired of travelling the long distance to the poblacion of Maragondon, decided to seek the separation of the barrio and its conversion into an independent municipality. Isidro Baltao headed a three-man delegation to Manila to petition the Spanish Governor-General Domingo Moriones for the conversion of Panitan into a town.

While still in Manila, Baltao and his companions were walking along the paved streets of Intramuros when they came upon Magallanes street. There and then, they decided to recommend that the new municipality be named Magallanes in honor of Ferdinand Magellan. The governor-general was said to have been impressed by the name Magallanes, and he also named the barrios of the new town after Spanish leaders and missionaries like Urdaneta, Ramirez, Pacheco, and Medina. Other streets of the town were also named after prominent Spaniards like Jovellar, Salcedo, Anda, Colon, San Jose, and San Isidro. The principal street was named Real (Royal), in honor of the Spanish king. Another street bore the name of De Guia after the patron saint of the town, Nuestra Señore de Guia.

Barrio Panitan, renamed Magallanes, became an independent municipality on 15 July 1879. The first gobernadorcillo of Magallanes was Anastacio Diones. The designation gobernadorcillo was changed to capitan municipal shortly before the outbreak of the Philippine Revolution. Juan Bello, a former capitan municipal, was the leader of Filipino revolutionists again Spain. When the Americans came the title, capitan municipal was changed to municipal president.

In 1904, the town was reverted to a barrio of Maragondon when its annual income became insufficient to maintain its status as an independent municipality. It was only in 1916 that Magallanes once again became a town.

Geography
Maragondon bounds the town on the north while the municipality of General Emilio Aguinaldo borders the north-east. Alfonso shares its southeast limits, while Nasugbu, Batangas is at the southern end.

Barangays
Magallanes is politically subdivided into 16 barangays.

Climate

Demographics

Economy 

Although the main source of livelihood in Magallanes is agriculture, it is evident that there has been a shift in emphasis from rice farming to coffee production because of the growing market demand for coffee. This is revealed in a study made by the Provincial Development Staff at Trece Martires City. Another reason is that the production of rice, corn and a wide variety of vegetables and fruits is more than sufficient to satisfy the nutritional demand of the population.

However, there is a large deficit in livestock and poultry production, which has been relegated to a backyard industry. To solve this problem there is need to encourage the establishment of livestock and poultry farms on a commercial scale. The local development plan calls for the introduction of high-yielding breeds and the conversion of idle lands into grazing pastures.

Magallanes has a potential labor force of 5,066 or 52.3 per cent of the total population. However, only 2,725 or 54 per cent of this number are economically active. The town has also a low unemployment rate of 3.7 per cent with only 100 of this labor force listed as unemployed. The existence of large and productive agricultural lands offers a wide variety of economic activities. The agricultural sector absorbs as much as 82 per cent of the labor force, while the service sector comprising teachers and government employees and workers account for only 15.6 per cent. A negligible 2.4 per cent are absorbed by the manufacturing, transportation and other commercial industries.

In 1980, the municipality's 2,250 families with an average of four members per family, earned a total of P 17,992,882, showing an average family income of P 7,997.00. About 71.9 per cent of the number belonged to the low group while 24.1 per cent comprised the middle class group. Only about 4 per cent of the population constituted the high income group. About 54 per cent or 1,223 families fall below the food threshold of P 5,272.86 and 1,781 or 79 per cent were below the total threshold of P 9,895.87.

The 1980 economic survey shows that the municipality had 2,043 households occupying 2,015 dwelling units, or a slight shortage of 28 housing units. Majority of the dwellings were of strong materials, including wood, galvanized iron, and concrete. The large percentage of houses using concrete may be due to the presence of a large gravel deposit comprising more than 300 hectares located in barangays Ramirez and Urdaneta. Plans for its development is now under study by the provincial government coordination with the Bureau of Mines.

In terms of health and sanitation Magallanes is deficient in health personnel and facilities. It lacks one doctor, one nurse, one dentist and two barangay health stations. The low awareness of proper sanitation and nutrition among the people, especially those of the lower class, aggravates the present health condition in the municipality.

Transportation within and outside the town is mainly by tricycles and jeepneys. It has approximately 77.639 kilometers of road, 43.922 kilometers being classified as primary, 19.217 secondary, and 15.500 tertiary road. It has one national road with a length of 22.35 kilometers, one provincial road extending 0.263 kilometer, eight municipal roads with a total length of 3.026 kilometers, and 18 barangay roads totalling 52 kilometers.

Electricity in the municipality is served by Meralco, which serves almost every part of the municipality. Water is supplied by the Magallanes Water System although some areas get their water from artesian wells, open wells, and springs.

Population growth is relatively low in Magallanes due to outmigration. The lack of employment and educational opportunities has caused the skilled workers to settle elsewhere.

Government

Elected officials
The following are the elected officials of the town elected last May 09, 2022 which serves until 2025:

List of local chief executives
The following is a list of town heads of Magallanes since it became a municipality:

References

External links

Profile: Magallanes, Cavite – Official Website of the Province of Cavite
Profile: Magallanes, Cavite – DILG Calabarzon Region
 [ Philippine Standard Geographic Code]
Philippine Census Information

Municipalities of Cavite